Jana Lahodová, married Vudmasková (4 June 1957 in Hradec Králové – 15 October 2010) was a Czech field hockey player who competed in the 1980 Summer Olympics.

References

External links
 

1957 births
2010 deaths
Czech female field hockey players
Olympic field hockey players of Czechoslovakia
Field hockey players at the 1980 Summer Olympics
Olympic silver medalists for Czechoslovakia
Olympic medalists in field hockey
Sportspeople from Hradec Králové
Medalists at the 1980 Summer Olympics